André Lannoy (born 1 March 1945) is a French former professional footballer who played as a goalkeeper. He played the majority of his career at Lens.

Honours 
Lens

 Division 2: 1972–73
 Coupe de France runner-up: 1974–75

Notes

References 

1945 births
Living people
Sportspeople from Calais
French footballers
Association football goalkeepers
Calais RUFC players
R.E. Mouscron players
RC Lens players

Championnat de France Amateur (1935–1971) players
Ligue 2 players
Ligue 1 players
French expatriate footballers
Expatriate footballers in Belgium
French expatriate sportspeople in Belgium
Footballers from Hauts-de-France